Graham Rawle is a UK writer and collage artist whose visual work incorporates illustration, design, photography and installation.  His weekly Lost Consonants series appeared in the Weekend Guardian for 15 years (1990-2005).  He has produced other regular series which include ‘Lying Doggo’ and ‘Graham Rawle’s Wonder Quiz’ for The Observer and ‘When Words Collide’ and ‘Pardon Mrs Arden’ for The Sunday Telegraph Magazine and 'Bright Ideas' for The Times.

Career
He has lectured and exhibited his work internationally, heading the design team that created the  'Hi-Life' supermarket installation for EXPO 2000 in Hanover. As director of the Niff Institute, in 2001 he created a range of limited edition art pieces that form the Niff Actuals product range.

Among his astonishing published books are The Wonder Book of Fun, Lying Doggo, Diary of an Amateur Photographer and a reinterpretation of The Wizard of Oz, which won 2009 Book of the Year and best Illustrated Trade book at the British Book Design and Production Awards. His critically acclaimed Woman's World, a novel created entirely from fragments of found text clipped from women's magazines of the 1950s and '60s, is being made into a found footage film collage. The Card was shortlisted for the 2013 Writers' Guild of Great Britain Book Award. His most recent novel Overland, designed to be read horizontally, was published in 2018.

Graham Rawle teaches part-time on the MA Sequential Design/Illustration and Arts and Design by Independent Project courses at The Faculty of Arts (University of Brighton).  He is Visiting Professor in Illustration at Norwich University of the Arts where in 2012 he was awarded an Honorary Doctorate for services to design. He lives in London.

Rawle accepted the role of Visiting Professor of Illustration from Falmouth School of Art at Falmouth University in 2016.

Bibliography
Lost Consonants, 1991
More Lost Consonants, 1992
Wonder Book of Fun, 1993
Lost Consonants 3, 1993
Lost Consonants 4, 1995
Lying Doggo, 1995
Lost Consonants 5, 1995
Lost Consonants 6, 1996
Lost Consonants 7, 1997
Diary of an Amateur Photographer, 1998
Return of Lost Consonants, 1999
Cassell’s Rhyming Slang, (with Jonathan Green) 2000
Woman’s World, 2005
The Wizard of Oz, (Illustrated) Original 1900 text by L. Frank Baum, 2008
The Card, 2012
Overland, 2018

References

External links
 Graham Rawle's official website
 Graham Rawle - University of Brighton staff profile

Academics of the University of Brighton
Living people
Year of birth missing (living people)